UCCA may stand for:

 Universities Central Council on Admissions, which handled applications to UK universities between 1961 and 1993
 Ukrainian Congress Committee of America, a not-for-profit organization represents the interests of America's ethnic Ukrainians
 University College for the Creative Arts, an art school based in England with campuses in Canterbury, Epsom, Farnham, Maidstone and Rochester
 Ullens Center for Contemporary Art, an art center in Beijing founded in 2007 by Guy and Myriam Ullens
 Universal Conceptual Cognitive Annotation, a semantic annotation framework for natural language text
UCCA Unitarian Christian Church of America formerly the Unitarian Christian Emerging Church